Atmospheric ghost lights are lights (or fires) that appear in the atmosphere without an obvious cause. Examples include the onibi, hitodama and will-o'-wisp. They are often seen in humid climates.

According to legend, some lights are wandering spirits of the dead, the work of devils (or yōkai), or the pranks of fairies. They are feared by some people as a portent of death. In other parts of the world, there are folk beliefs that supernatural fires appear where treasure is buried; these fires are said to be the spirits of the treasure or the spirits of humans buried with grave goods. Atmospheric ghost lights are also sometimes thought to be related to UFOs.

Some ghost lights such as St. Elmo's fire or the shiranui have been explained as optical phenomena of light emitted through electrical activity. Other types may be due to combustion of flammable gases, ball lightning, meteors, torches and other human-made fires, the misperception of human objects, and pranks. Almost all such fires have received such naturalistic explanations.

Australia
Min Min Light - a phenomenon believed to occur in outback Australia. The lights originate from before European colonization but have now become part of modern urban folklore.

Japan
In addition to the onibi and hitodama, there are other examples of atmospheric ghost lights in legend, such as the kitsunebi and the shiranui:

In the Nobeoka, Miyazaki Prefecture area, atmospheric ghost lights were described in first-hand accounts until the middle of the Meiji period. Two balls of fire would appear side by side on rainy nights at a pond known as the Misuma pond (Misumaike). It was said that a woman lent an osa (a guide for yarn on a loom) to another woman; when she returned to retrieve it, the two argued and fell into the pond. Their dispute became an atmospheric ghost fire, still said to be burning. Legend has it that misfortune befalls anyone who sees the fire.

Obora
Related in legends on Ōmi Island in Ehime Prefecture, it is said to be the spiritual fire of a deceased person. In Miyakubo village, Ochi District in the same prefecture (now Imabari), they are known as oborabi. A legend exists of atmospheric ghost fires appearing above the sea or at graves; these are sometimes the same kind of fire.

Related in legends on Nuwa Island, Ehime Prefecture and in the folklore publication Sōgō Nippon Minzoku Goi, this is a fire appearing at night on New Year's Eve behind the patron Shinto god's shrine on Nuwa Island. It is accompanied by sounds similar to human screaming, and is interpreted by local residents as a sign that the goddess of luck has appeared.

This fire appeared in the fantasy collection, Sanshū Kidan. It is said to appear at Hachiman, Jōshikaidō and Komatsu as a fuse-like atmospheric ghost light.

In a legend in Tenkō village, Shiki District, Nara Prefecture (now Sakurai), hundreds of spiders became a ball of fire in the air and one would die upon contact with it. Similarly, in Tamashimayashima, Kurashiki, Okayama Prefecture the Kumo no Hi is said to be the work of spiders. As a red ball of fire appears above the forest near the Inari shrine on the island, it is said to dance around above the mountains and forest and then disappear. In Banshū (now Hyōgo Prefecture), according to Nishihari Kaidan Jikki (in the section "Sayō Shunsō Anzekyū Ika wo Mishi Mono") an atmospheric ghost light would appear in the village of Sayō, Sayō District, Banshū. Although "perhaps it is a spider fire", its details have not been made clear.

In legends from the area around Honjō-ji, Sanjō, Niigata Prefecture, Isono no Gongorō, after winning at gambling, was killed; his murder became an atmospheric ghost light. At a nearby family farm Gongorōbi is a sign of impending rain, and peasants who see it hurry to retrieve their rice-drying racks.

In a Yomihon (Ehon Sayo Shigure) from the Edo period, at Minakuchi, Ōmi (now Kōka, Shiga Prefecture) there was a person who made a livelihood out of selling jōsen (candy made from the sap of Rehmannia glutinosa, boiled into a paste) who was killed by a robber. It is said that the vendor became an atmospheric ghost fire, floating on rainy nights.

Sōrikanko
Told in legends of Shioire, Oodachi, Hachinohe, Aomori Prefecture, its name means "the Kanko of Shioiri village". A beautiful girl named Kanko received many marriage proposals, but refused them all since she loved someone else. One of her suitors buried her alive in the Niida River, and her atmospheric ghost light became able to fly. When a cement factory was later built there, a small shrine to Kanko was included.

Told in the legends of Niigata Prefecture, on rainy nights it would fly airily around a place where bodies are washed for burial.

A legend from Nagaoka District, Tosa Province (now Kōchi Prefecture), nobi appears in a variety of locations. An umbrella-sized fire would float, bursting apart into star-like lights that would spread from four or five shaku to several hundreds of meters apart. It is said that by putting saliva on a zōri and calling it, it would dance brilliantly in the sky above one's head.

United States
Spooklight - a stationary unexplained light appearing west of the small town of Hornet, Missouri as early as the 1830s.

Notes

References

 
 
 

 
Japanese folklore
UFO-related phenomena